Sergio Carrasco García (born 17 February 1985 in Puerto Serrano) is a Spanish former professional road racing cyclist. He rode in the 2010 and 2012 editions of the Vuelta a España.

Palmarès
2009
3rd Vuelta a Vizcaya
3rd Clásica de Pascua CC Padrones

References

1985 births
Living people
Spanish male cyclists
People from Sierra de Cádiz
Sportspeople from the Province of Cádiz
Cyclists from Andalusia